Claudine Rinner (born 1965) is a French amateur astronomer from Ottmarsheim in Alsace, France. She is an observer at Ottmarsheim Observatory  and a discoverer of minor planets and comets, who received the Edgar Wilson Award for her discoveries.

Career 

Participant in the Morocco Oukaimeden Sky Survey (MOSS), Rinner discovered three comets using a 0.5-metre robotic telescope at Oukaïmeden Observatory located in Morocco. She won the 2013 Edgar Wilson Award for discovering three comets which were designated 373P/Rinner (P/2011 W2),  (MOSS), and 281P/MOSS. Rinner is also credited by the Minor Planet Center with the discovery of more than 100 minor planets since 2004, including several co-discoveries with François Kugel (see list below).

Awards and honors 

The asteroid 23999 Rinner, discovered by French amateur astronomer Laurent Bernasconi in 1999, was named in her honor. The official  was published by the Minor Planet Center on 21 July 2005.

In 2020, she and Michel Ory jointly received the Dorothea Klumpke – Isaac Roberts prize from the Société astronomique de France.

Discoveries

List of discovered minor planets 

Some of Claudine Rinner's discoveries were made in collaboration with  François Kugel

See also

References

External links 
 En bref : cocorico, enfin une comète française ! 
 Le projet MOSS (2011-2018), Michel Ory

21st-century French astronomers
Amateur astronomers
 01
1965 births
Living people
Discoverers of asteroids
Women astronomers
20th-century French astronomers
20th-century French women scientists
21st-century French women scientists
Women planetary scientists
Planetary scientists